Benut is a mukim in Pontian District, Johor, Malaysia.

Geography

Demographics
Benut has a population of 15,389 people.

Education

Primary school

Sekolah Kebangsaan Sri Benut 
Sekolah Kebangsaan Seri Sinaran
Sekolah Kebangsaan Seri Setia
Sekolah Kebangsaan Seri Senang Hati
Sekolah Kebangsaan Seri Semangat
Sekolah Kebangsaan Seri Kembar
Sekolah Kebangsaan Seri Jaya
Sekolah Kebangsaan Seri Bahagia
Sekolah Kebangsaan Seri Al Ulum
Sekolah Kebangsaan Parit Markom
Sekolah Kebangsaan seri Bugis Benut
Sekolah Kebangsaan Benut
Sekolah Jenis Kebangsaan (Cina)  Lok Yu(2)
Sekolah Jenis Kebangsaan (Cina)  Lok Yu 6
Sekolah Jenis Kebangsaan (Cina)  Lok Yu 4
Sekolah Jenis Kebangsaan (Cina)  Lok Yu 3
Sekolah Jenis Kebangsaan (Cina)  Lok Yu 1
Sekolah Jenis Kebangsaan (Cina)  Lok York

Secondary school
Sekolah Menengah Kebangsaan Sri Tanjung
Sekolah Menengah Kebangsaan Parit Betak
Sekolah Menengah Kebangsaan Benut
sekolah Menengah Agama Arab An-Nur

Transportation
The mukim is served by TransJohor public buses linking to Pontian Kechil.

References

Mukims of Pontian District